The 2018 Colombia police stations attacks occurred on January 27, 2018, when two hand grenades were thrown at police stations in Barranquilla and Soledad. About five officers died (a sixth later on) and 48 people were wounded, the latter of which included some civilians. On January 28, two policemen died after an attack on a police station in Santa Rosa del Sur, bringing the death toll to seven. All the dead were serving officers in the National Police of Colombia.

The National Liberation Army (ELN) was responsible for the attacks on the police stations. The attacks were one of the deadliest on the security forces in the last few years in Colombia.

Colombian President Juan Manuel Santos suspended peace talks with the group afterwards.

Victims
The dead victims of the third attack were Manuel Galvis Contreras and Ferney Alexander Posada.

References

Terrorist incidents in 2018
Terrorist incidents in South America in 2018
January 2018 crimes in South America
January 2018 events in South America
Attacks on police stations in the 2010s
Mass murder in 2018
2018 murders in Colombia
Communist terrorism
Terrorist incidents in Colombia in the 2010s